Elena Nikolayevna Gogoleva ( Moscow – 15 November 1993) was a Soviet and Russian film and stage actress, actress of the Maly Theatre in Moscow from 1918 to 1993. She was a People's Artist of the USSR (1949), Hero of Socialist Labour (1974), and the winner of three Stalin Prizes (1947, 1948, 1949). She joined the CPSU in 1948.

Filmography
  Angelo (1920)
 Gobseck (1936)
 Least We Forget (1954)
 Wings (1956)
 A Glass of Water (1957)
 Two Lives (1961)
 Dostigayev and others (1971)
 The Queen of Spades (1982)

References

External links
 
 

1900 births
1993 deaths
Actresses from Moscow
Burials at Vagankovo Cemetery
Communist Party of the Soviet Union members
Heroes of Socialist Labour
Honored Artists of the RSFSR
People's Artists of the RSFSR
People's Artists of the USSR
Recipients of the Order of Friendship of Peoples
Recipients of the Order of Lenin
Recipients of the Order of the Red Banner of Labour
Russian Academy of Theatre Arts alumni
Russian film actresses
Russian stage actresses
Soviet film actresses
Soviet stage actresses
Spoken word artists
Stalin Prize winners